is a mountain located on the border of Futtsu and Kyonan, Chiba Prefecture.

Narcissus cultivation

Mount Saga is home to one of the largest areas of narcissus flower cultivation in Japan. The flowers are grown in terraced plots along the slopes of the mountain, mostly those facing Kyonan. The plantings are primarily of the Nihon variety of narcissus, which probably originated in south China and came to Japan via the Kuroshio Current. The daimyō Matsudaira Sadanobu (1759–1829), administrator of Shirakawa Domain in present-day Fukushima Prefecture, visited the area in 1811 and noted the mountain and its narcissus cultivation in his diary.

Cultivation has spread to the peak of Mount Saga. The Japanese word for narcissus is suisen, and the summit of Mount Saga is known as Suisen Peak. The mountain is a popular hiking destination from late December to early February when the narcissus bloom.

Hiking routes

The peak of Mount Saga can be reached from either Futtsu or Kyonan.

Kyonan–JR East's Uchibō Line Hota Station to Kyonan Chōei Bus, Kobota Stop. Suisen Peak is an hour and a half hike from the bus stop.
Futtsu–Suisen Peak is an hour-and-a-half to two-hour hike from the Kyonan-Hota Interchange on the Futtsu Tateyama Road.

References

Saga
Saga